Operation Nuke is the title of the second book in the Cyborg series of science fiction/secret agent novels by Martin Caidin which was first published in 1973, just prior to Cyborg being adapted as the television series The Six Million Dollar Man. The first paperback edition of the novel was published as a tie-in with the series.

Plot summary
Steve Austin, an astronaut-turned-cyborg working for a secret branch of American intelligence, is set in pursuit of a criminal syndicate using nuclear blackmail to hold the world to ransom.

External links

1973 American novels
1973 science fiction novels
American science fiction novels
American spy novels
Bionic franchise
Novels by Martin Caidin